The 2002 CONCACAF Gold Cup Final was a soccer match to determine the winners of the 2002 CONCACAF Gold Cup. The match was held at the Rose Bowl in Pasadena, California, on February 2, 2002, and was contested by the winners of the semi-finals, the United States and Costa Rica. This was the first Gold Cup Final that Costa Rica has reached, and the second ever from a Central American nation; the first one was in 1991 when Honduras reached the final. The United States won 2–0 with goals from Josh Wolff and Jeff Agoos, sealing their second-ever Gold Cup victory.

Route to the final

Match

References

External links 
 Official website 

Final
CONCACAF Gold Cup finals
CONCACAF Gold Cup Final
CONCACAF Gold Cup Final
Costa Rica national football team matches
United States men's national soccer team matches
Sports competitions in Pasadena, California
CONCACAF Gold Cup Final
CONCACAF Gold Cup Final
21st century in Pasadena, California